Philip Kibitok (born 23 March 1971) is a Kenyan middle-distance runner. He competed in the men's 800 metres at the 1996 Summer Olympics.

References

1971 births
Living people
Athletes (track and field) at the 1996 Summer Olympics
Kenyan male middle-distance runners
Olympic athletes of Kenya
Place of birth missing (living people)